Alphonse Alan Dotson (born February 25, 1943) is a former American football defensive tackle who played college American football at Grambling State, where he was All-American in 1964.

He was drafted by the National Football League's Green Bay Packers in the 2nd round (24th overall) of the 1965 NFL Draft but signed with the American Football League's Kansas City Chiefs and played a year. In 1966, he played for the AFL's Miami Dolphins. From 1967-1970 he played for the AFL's Oakland Raiders, mostly as a backup as he recorded only 4 career starts. The Raiders defensive line of that era was Ike Lassiter, Ben Davidson, Tom Keating, and Dan Birdwell, a group who set the NFL sack record (broken in 1984 by the Chicago Bears), so Dotson did not get a lot of playing time, although he played in most of the games while with the Raiders.

His son is Santana Dotson, himself a former All-American and also the 1993 NFL Defensive Rookie of the Year with the Tampa Bay Buccaneers and played in two Super Bowls with the Green Bay Packers. He was a Super Bowl champion winning Super Bowl XXXI with the Packers.

When his son, Santana, had become a free agent, Alphonse acted as his son's agent used his commission on the deal to purchase  which includes grapevines that covered 1/3 of the land. So now, Dotson is now a grape grower at Certenberg Vineyards in Texas. He also is a former president of the Texas Wine and Grape Growers Association.

Dotson's grandson Alonzo Dotson, a defensive end, played college American football at the University of Oklahoma where he was part of two National Championship games and won three Big XII Conference Championships. Alonzo is now a National Scout For The Buffalo Bills after 4 seasons as a area scout for the New York Jets, he also spent 5 seasons with the Green Bay Packers as a college scout.

References

1943 births
Living people
American football defensive tackles
Oakland Raiders players
Kansas City Chiefs players
Farmers from Texas
Miami Dolphins players
Grambling State Tigers football players
American Football League players